HMNZS Manawanui is a multi-role offshore support vessel currently commissioned in the Royal New Zealand Navy. The ship replaces two decommissioned vessels, the hydrographic survey ship  and the diving support vessel .

Defence officials reviewed 150 vessels before identifying the 85-metre Norwegian built MV Edda Fonn as suitable for conversion. It was delivered in May 2019 and commissioned on 7 June of the same year. Edda Fonn is equipped with the diving and hydrographic systems required by the Navy.

See also
  - NIWA ice-strengthened research ship

References

External links 
 HMNZS Manawanui official page 
 Tour HMNZS Manawanui, NZ Defence Force, 15 June 2019, YouTube
 Jane's - as of 14 March 2019, the vessel has received its service livery and begun a series of sea trials off the coast of Denmark. The trials are being used to confirm that naval equipment on board the ship are performing as expected, the RNZN said via its official social media account on 15 March. Images of the vessel accompanying the post indicate the hull number as A 09.
 IHC Hytech Dutch based company delivered all the diving gear such as the machinery container, containerized decompression chamber, HD lars system, and a Wet bell with gantry handling system complete with dive control station.
 Ridzwan Rahmat, New Zealand begins final upgrades on new hydrographic vessel, Jane's Navy International, 5 May 2020. References Facebook post HMNZS Manawanui manoeuvring into Devonport Naval Base’s drydock (also of 5 May 2020).
 HMNZS Manawanui heads to RIMPAC, HMNZS Manawanui heads to Rim of the Pacific exercise around Hawaii.

Auxiliary ships of the Royal New Zealand Navy
2003 ships